Fall Creek Academy was a free public charter school for grades 6–12 in Indianapolis, Indiana.  It offered a "Middle College" program that allowed qualifying high school students to take college courses for college credit at no additional cost while still enrolled in high school.

The school closed at the end of the 2014 school year because its charter authorizer, Ball State University, declined to renew, citing the school's poor academic performance.

References

External links 
 Fall Creek Academy

Charter schools in Indiana
Schools in Indianapolis
Public high schools in Indiana
Public middle schools in Indiana